Uterqüe is a fashion brand of the Spanish Inditex group dedicated to accessories and garments such as scarves and sunglasses. It was founded in 2008 as a company with headquarters in Tordera, Barcelona in Catalonia. In September 2021, Inditex announced the closing of all physical stores, but remaining as a brand within Massimo Dutti retail chain. 

The company had 90 stores in 16 countries: 

Africa
 Morocco: 1
Americas
 Mexico: 15
Asia
 Saudi Arabia: 5
 Qatar: 3
 Kuwait: 2
 United Arab Emirates: 2
 Jordan: 1
 Kazakhstan: 1
 Lebanon: 1
Europe
 Spain: 33
 Russia: 13
 Portugal: 6
 Poland: 4
 Andorra: 1
 Romania: 1
 Ukraine: 1

References 

Companies based in Catalonia
Spanish companies established in 2008
Clothing companies established in 2008
Retail companies established in 2008
Inditex brands
Clothing brands of Spain
High fashion brands
2021 mergers and acquisitions